Silver Creek (also known as Silver Run or Verdilla Run) is a tributary of the Susquehanna River in Snyder County, Pennsylvania, in the United States. The creek has no named tributaries, but it does have several unnamed tributaries. Many of these, as well as Silver Creek itself, are impaired by sedimentation/siltation due to grazing-related agriculture. The watershed is partly or fully in the Ridge and Valley physiographic province.

The dominant land use in the upper reaches of the watershed of Silver Creek is agricultural land. However, forests and other land uses are also present, and some pockets of development occur in the creek's valley. The creek causes flooding in the southern part of Union Township. A number of bridges have been constructed across Silver Creek. Its drainage basin is designated as a Warmwater Fishery and a Migratory Fishery.

Course
Silver Creek begins on a hill in Washington Township. It flows south for a few tenths of a mile, almost immediately entering Union Township and entering a valley. The creek then gradually turns east for several tenths of a mile before turning east-southeast. After several tenths of a mile, it turns east and then north-northeast before turning east-northeast for several tenths of a mile, receiving an unnamed tributary from the left. The creek then flows east-southeast for several tenths of a mile, receiving another unnamed tributary from the left before eventually turning south-southeast. A short distance further downstream, the creek receives an unnamed tributary from the right and turns east-northeast for several tenths of a mile before turning east-southeast and receiving an unnamed tributary from the left. It then turns south-southeast for a few tenths of a mile before turning west-southwest and then south-southeast. The creek soon turns south-southwest for several tenths of a mile, passing through a small pond before turning southwest and receiving another unnamed tributary from the right. It then turns south-southeast for several tenths of a mile, entering the census-designated place of Port Trevorton, where it continues flowing in the same direction. After several tenths of a mile, it crosses U.S. Route 11/U.S. Route 15, and a short distance after that, it reaches its confluence with the Susquehanna River.

Tributaries
Silver Creek has no named tributaries. However, it does have five unnamed tributaries, two of which each have a single sub-tributary of their own. Five tributaries and subtributaries of the creekUnt 17535, Unt 17536, Unt 17537, Unt 17538, and Unt 17539 are designated as impaired waterbodies, for the same reason as Silver Creek itself.

Hydrology
Some reaches of Silver Creek are designated as impaired waterbodies. The cause of the impairment is sedimentation/siltation and the source of impairment is grazing-related agriculture. All stream segments in the upper reaches of the watershed are considered to be impaired, while none are impaired in the lower reaches.

Ag Development once received a permit to discharge stormwater into Silver Creek for construction purposes.

Geography, geology, and climate

Silver Creek is partly or fully in the Ridge and Valley physiographic province. The dominant hydrologic soil group in the upper part of the watershed is C. There are significant deposits of sediment along the stream, and streambank erosion occurs in the watershed. The surface geology consists of interbedded sedimentary rock in 89 percent of the upper part of the watershed and sandstone in the remaining 11 percent.

Watershed and biology
The mouth of the creek is located in the United States Geological Survey quadrangle of Pillow. However, its source is located in the quadrangle of Dalmatia. Its source is located near Verdilla.

The main land use in the upper part of the watershed of Silver Creek is agricultural land, which accounts for 76 percent of the watershed's area. Another 15 percent is forested land, and the remaining 9 percent has other uses. There are some areas of developed land along the creek. Tillage is done in the watershed's agricultural areas.

The southern part of Union Township in impacted by flooding from Silver Creek. During Tropical Storm Agnes in June 1972, flood levels reached to between the 100 year flood and the 500 year flood.

History and name
Silver Creek was entered into the Geographic Names Information System on August 2, 1979. Its identifier in the Geographic Names Information System is 1187671. The creek is also known as Silver Run and Verdilla Run. Both of these variant names appear on a 1953 United States Geological Survey map.

In the late 1960s, civil engineer Stanley K. Sampsell was unable to find any official records to determine the name of Silver Creek. The United States Geological Survey's 15' Millersburg map called the upper part of the creek (which flows in a roughly southeasterly direction) "Verdilla Run" and the lower part (which flows in a roughly southerly direction) "Silver Run". Sampsell checked with nearly all people living along the stream, and everyone referred to it as "Silver Creek" and had never heard of the names "Silver Run" or "Verdilla Run". For this reason, he formally proposed that the creek be officially renamed to "Silver Creek".

In the late 1920s, the Commissioners of Snyder County had plans for the construction of a bridge over Silver Creek near Port Trevorton.

In 2011, the Pennsylvania Department of Environmental Protection solicited comments on its proposed total maximum daily load for the Silver Creek watershed. However, no public comments were received.

Biology
The drainage basin of Silver Creek is designated as a Warmwater Fishery and a Migratory Fishery. The designated use of Silver Creek is aquatic life.

Silver Creek has little or no riparian buffer where it flows through agricultural land, and some reaches experience mowing up to the stream's banks. Livestock also have access to the creek.

See also
Herrold Run, next tributary of the Susquehanna River going downriver
Fidlers Run, next tributary of the Susquehanna River going upriver
List of rivers of Pennsylvania

References

Rivers of Snyder County, Pennsylvania
Tributaries of the Susquehanna River
Rivers of Pennsylvania